The 1937 BYU Cougars football team was an American football team that represented Brigham Young University (BYU) as a member of the Rocky Mountain Conference (RMC) during the 1937 college football season. In their first season under head coach Eddie Kimball, the Cougars compiled an overall record of 6–3 wth a mark of 5–2 against conference opponents, tied for second place in the RMC, and outscored opponents by a total of 164 to 41.

Schedule

References

BYU
BYU Cougars football seasons
BYU Cougars football